Saltpeter War may refer to:
Saltpeter War (Mexico), 1480–1510
Saltpeter Wars (Germany), 1725–27, 1738 and 1743–45
War of the Pacific, 1879–1883